José Miguel Alemán Healy (born 8 May 1956, in Panama City) is a Panamanian politician.

He spent a significant part of his childhood living in Washington, DC while his father, Roberto Alemán Zubieta, was serving as one of the leading negotiators for the Robles-Johnson Treaties and later on as Ambassador of Panama to the United States (1968–69).
His Brother is Jaime Alemán Healy, a Panamanian lawyer and Ambassador of Panama to the United States.

José Miguel first entered the Panamanian political scene in the 1994 elections, when he ran for a position in the National Assembly representing the Arnulfista Party, of which he was a founding member. Even though he was not successful, he remained active in his party and served as foreign minister from September 1999 to January 2003, during the presidency of Mireya Moscoso (1999–2004).
In the 2004 Panamanian presidential election, he was the candidate for the Arnulfista Party. He received 16% of the vote.

José Miguel Alemán is married to Victoria Dutari Martinelli de Alemán; the couple have two sons Miguel Alemán Dutari born in 1987 and Felipe José Alemán Dutari born in 1991.

José Miguel Alemán served on Conarex, Panama’s council on foreign relations, from 2009 to 2014.

He is director of the Aramo Fiduciary Services Inc. and partner at Arias, Aleman & Mora.

References

External links
Alemán campaign website (offline) archive

1956 births
Living people
People from Panama City
Panameñista Party politicians
Government ministers of Panama
Ambassadors of Panama to the United States